Aldo Teo "Buff" Donelli (July 22, 1907 – August 9, 1994) was an American football player and coach, soccer player, and college athletics administrator.  He served as the head football coach at Duquesne University from 1939 to 1942, Boston University from 1947 to 1956, and Columbia University from 1957 to 1967, compiling a career college football coaching record of 105–107–8.  Donelli was also a head coach in the National Football League (NFL), with the Pittsburgh Steelers for part of the 1941 season and with the Cleveland Rams in 1944, tallying a career mark of 4–11 in the NFL.  From 1951 to 1955 he was the athletic director at Boston University.  Donelli played college football at Duquesne and was an assistant football coach at his alma mater from 1930 to 1938, before being promoted to head coach.  He played soccer with a number of clubs in the 1920s and 1930s and was a member of the United States men's national soccer team during the 1934 FIFA World Cup.  He is a member of the National Soccer Hall of Fame.

Soccer

Club
In 1925, Donelli played for Morgan F.C., a western Pennsylvania soccer team.  At some point, he moved to Cleveland Slavia, playing for them at least the winter of 1929–30.  In January and February 1934, he is listed with Curry Silver Tops and then Heidelberg SC from February to April 1936.  He also played for Castle Shannon in March 1938.

National team
Donelli was selected to the United States 1934 FIFA World Cup team. In a 4–2 qualifying victory over Mexico in Rome, Italy on May 24, he tallied all four times, becoming the first American to score his first three international goals with the senior team in the same match (Sacha Kljestan would become the second to achieve this feat on January 24, 2009). Three days later in the same stadium, Donelli scored the lone U.S. goal in its 7–1 first-round elimination loss to Italy. It would be the last one any American scored on Italian turf for another 56 years, and also the only Italian American to score against Italy. He was inducted into U.S. National Soccer Hall of Fame in 1954.

Football

College
Donelli, who played college football at Duquesne University in Pittsburgh, Pennsylvania, was a halfback and punter.  He went on to coach Duquesne University, Columbia University, Boston University, and the Pittsburgh Steelers and Cleveland Rams of the National Football League.

Duquesne, NFL
Donelli took over as Duquesne head coach in 1939, compiling a 29–4–2 record as the Dukes finished in the top ten twice in four seasons.  His tenure at his alma mater also gave him a place in the history books as the only man to serve as head coach of both a college and NFL team simultaneously.  Donelli served as head coach of the Pittsburgh Steelers during the 1941 fall campaign on the bluff of Duquesne University.  The Dukes were on their way to an undefeated season in 1941 and after the Steelers lost their first two games, coach (and later NFL Commissioner) Bert Bell resigned, having Donelli replace him.  Aldo would coach the Steelers in the morning during classes at Duquesne University and then the Dukes in the afternoon. Although his college team finished undefeated, the Steelers lost all five games under Donelli.  He also coached the Cleveland Rams for a single season (1944), attaining a 4–6 record.

Boston University and Columbia
Donelli continued on to coach at Boston University from 1947 to 1956 with a 46–34–4 record and again placing a season in the top 25 poll. In 1957, he was named the head coach at Columbia University where he would serve until 1967 compiling a 30–76–4 record. In 1961, he coached Columbia to its only Ivy League championship.

Other accomplishments
Donelli  was a founding member of Alpha Phi Delta, Psi chapter, the national Italian heritage fraternity, at Duquesne University on March 19, 1929.  Donelli received his business degree from Duquesne University in 1930 and his graduate business degree in 1931.

Donelli was drafted into the United States Navy for a short time during the last year of World War II.  In the late 1960s and throughout the 1970s after semi-retiring from coaching, he worked in public relations for PGA events around Boston while keeping homes in suburban Pittsburgh and then eventually Florida.

Honors
Columbia University's weight room is named in Donelli's honor.

Head coaching record

College

Professional

References

1907 births
1994 deaths
American football halfbacks
American football punters
American soccer players
Association football forwards
Boston University Terriers athletic directors
Boston University Terriers football coaches
Castle Shannon SC players
Cleveland Rams coaches
Cleveland Slavia players
Columbia Lions football coaches
Duquesne Dukes athletic directors
Duquesne Dukes football coaches
Duquesne Dukes football players
Morgan F.C. players
Philadelphia Eagles players
Pittsburgh Steelers coaches
Pittsburgh Steelers players
St. Louis Rams coaches
United States men's international soccer players
1934 FIFA World Cup players
National Soccer Hall of Fame members
United States Navy personnel of World War II
People from South Fayette Township, Allegheny County, Pennsylvania
Players of American football from Fort Lauderdale, Florida
Players of American football from Pennsylvania
Soccer players from Pennsylvania
American people of Italian descent
Cleveland Rams head coaches
Pittsburgh Steelers head coaches